Kristek House is a building on the corner of Tišnovská and Trávníky Streets in Brno, Czech Republic that was transformed into a monumental assemblage by the Czech sculptor, painter and action artist Lubo Kristek. Kristek created the work between 2015–2017.

Description 

A main feature of the house is a surrealist-inspired clock based on the Myth of Sisyphus.

The clockwork was designed and constructed especially for this purpose by the Elekon company (Vyškov), a specialist in public clocks. The system provides exact time and incorporates a changeover to winter time.

Another aspect of Kristek House is a railway line is painted on the façade and incorporated into one of the artist's important symbols – the heavenly highway. This symbol can be found already in his painting The Heavenly Highway of Aunt Fränzi (1974) that is today part of the collection of Neues Stadtmuseum in Landsberg am Lech. 
train from Kristek's childhood, the former Brno-Tišnov railway line (in Czech: Tišnovka). 

At the corner of the house two larg sculptures of golden hands rise, their palms turned upwards. The hands also protect the living tree and together represent the central symbol of the monumental assemblage.

Kristek House was the set for the films Ab ovo and Sisyphiade.

References 

Buildings and structures in Brno
Tourist attractions in Brno